Don Bowie may refer to:

 Don Bowie (climber) (born 1969), Canadian  professional high altitude climber
 Don Bowie (footballer) (born 1940), Scottish footballer